The Connecticut Yankee was a long-distance train in western New England, that in its first two decades was an international night train, established in 1936, that extended from New York City into southeastern Quebec, to Sherbrooke and Quebec City, a  trip. The pooled train covered railroad territories of the New York, New Haven and Hartford, Boston and Maine, Canadian Pacific Railway and the Quebec Central Railway. It was the last U.S.-Canadian train serving the Sherbrooke to eastern Vermont route.

The train had some sharing of sleeping cars with the Boston & Maine'''s overnight Red Wing (the night train counterpart to the Alouette) which went from Boston to Montreal. In Newport, Vermont, the train would pick up sleepers from the B&M train and continue to Sherbrooke and Quebec.

Railroad territories and major stops
New Haven Railroad - New York City to Springfield, Massachusetts Canadian Pacific June 1943 timetableBoston & Maine April 28, 1946 timetable, Table 70 http://streamlinermemories.info/Eastern/B&M46TT.pdf
Grand Central Terminal, Stamford, Bridgeport, New Haven, Hartford, Springfield, Massachusetts

Boston & Maine - Springfield to Wells River, Vermont (except between Windsor and White River Junction)
Springfield, Northampton, Greenfield, Brattleboro, Bellows Falls, Claremont Junction, White River Junction, Wells River

Central Vermont - Windsor to White River Junction (then resuming travelling north on B&M trains)

Canadian Pacific - Wells River to Sherbrooke
Wells River, St. Johnsbury, Newport, Sherbrooke

Quebec Central - Sherbrooke to Quebec City
Sherbrooke, Tring Jonction in Robert-Ciche, Vallée Jonction in La Nouvelle-Beauce, Quebec City (Gare du Palais)

Decline

Between the summer of 1951 and autumn of 1952, the route ended in Wells River, Vermont, marking the end of international train service directly south of Quebec City toward New England. (Passengers from New England wishing to reach Sherbrooke or Quebec City needed to take a bus between Wells River and Sherbrooke, whereupon they could take a train to Quebec City.)New Haven timetable, September 28, 1952, Table 34 However, the train took a  diversion at Wells River along Canadian Pacific tracks to Newport, Vermont, then a northwest-ward path toward Montreal. It was a night train on the northbound-Montreal trip; yet it was a day train on the southbound trip. As such, the train had no sleeping car for either direction of the trip. 

Between the summer of 1958 and spring of 1959, the route had its northern limit cut from Wells River to Springfield, Massachusetts, the end of the New Haven territory for its route. Boston & Maine having begun scaling back its longer distance routes, the B&M offered a train, timed to connect, from Springfield to White River Junction.Official Guide of the Railways, August 1958, Boston & Maine section, Table 9Official Guide of the Railways, April 1959, Boston & Maine section, Table 1 In 1961 the train continued for its NY-Springfield route, but it bore the name Bankers for the southbound trip.Official Guide of the Railways, June 1961, New York, New Haven & Hartford section, Table 5 and pp. 108-109 (The Pennsylvania Railroad and New Haven Railroad's Montrealer,'' traveling between Washington, D.C. and Montreal, another train serving the upper Connecticut River Valley, would continue service north of Springfield until September, 1966.) 

The train regained the name for both directions and persisted into the Penn Central and Amtrak periods. It was Springfield to Philadelphia train southbound and Washington to Springfield train northbound until ending in 1977.  Amtrak briefly resumed the train from 1983 to 1995.

Notes

Named passenger trains of Canada
Named passenger trains of the United States
Night trains of the United States
International named passenger trains
Passenger rail transportation in Vermont
Passenger rail transportation in Massachusetts
Passenger rail transportation in Connecticut
Passenger rail transportation in New York (state)
Passenger rail transportation in New Jersey
Passenger rail transportation in Pennsylvania
Passenger rail transportation in Delaware
Passenger rail transportation in Maryland
Passenger rail transportation in Washington, D.C.
Passenger rail transport in Quebec
Railway services introduced in 1936
Railway services discontinued in 1995
Former Amtrak routes